
This is a sortable list of tributaries of the Mississippi River.

Table

Map of Mississippi River Basin 

Mississippi